Martin Hautzinger (born 1950) is a German psychologist and professor.

Early life 
Hautzinger was born in Frankenbach, Heilbronn in 1950.

Career 
Martin Hautzinger studied psychology from 1971 to 1976 in Bochum and at the Free University of Berlin. In 1980 he was awarded his doctorate from the Technical University of Berlin.

In 1981, he was appointed a professor of clinical psychology and psychodiagnostics at the University of Freiburg. From 1981 to 1983 he held the position of assistant professor at the University of Oregon in Eugene (United States), where he worked with Peter M. Lewinsohn. From 1984 to 1989 he was assistant professor of clinical and differential psychology at the University of Konstanz.

In 1990, he was appointed professor and head of the department of clinical psychology at the psychological institute of the University of Mainz. Since 1996 he has been professor of clinical psychology at the University of Tübingen, succeeding Niels Birbaumer.

His research focuses on cognitive behavioural therapy in mood affective disorders. He is the author and editor of several German textbooks and self-help guides in the fields of clinical psychology and behavioural therapy, and co-author of the German version of the Beck Depression Inventory.

Prof. Martin Hautzinger with Prof. Dr. Dr. Ilhan Kizilhan, have a great roll of the foundation of Institute of Psychotherapy and Psychotraumatology (IPP) in the University of Duhok (UoD). IPP has a long-term goal to enhance the mental health capacity within Kurdistan region, and for this purpose; the university master program was developed on a German Model.

Notable works 
 Martin Hautzinger: Depression im Alter. 1. Aufl. 2000, BeltzPVU, Weinheim, .
 Aaron T. Beck, A. John Rush, Brian F. Shaw: Kognitive Therapie der Depression. Herausgegeben von Martin Hautzinger. 5. Aufl. 2001, BeltzPVU, Weinheim. .
 Martin Hautzinger: Kognitive Verhaltenstherapie bei Depressionen. 6. Aufl. 2003, BeltzPVU, Weinheim, .
 Michael Linden, Martin Hautzinger: Verhaltenstherapiemanual. 7. Aufl. 2011, Springer, .

References

1950 births
German psychologists
Academic staff of Johannes Gutenberg University Mainz
People from Heilbronn
Free University of Berlin alumni
Academic staff of the University of Freiburg
University of Oregon faculty
Academic staff of the University of Konstanz
Academic staff of the University of Tübingen
German expatriates in the United States
Expatriate academics in the United States
Living people